xxxHolic (also known as ) is a 2013 Japanese supernatural dark fantasy drama miniseries based on a manga series with a same name written and illustrated by manga artist group CLAMP. The miniseries stars Anne Watanabe and Shōta Sometani as Yuko Ichihara and Kimihiro Watanuki respectively. The miniseries was broadcast on Wowow from February 24, 2013, and ended on April 16, 2013.

Premise
xxxHolic follows the story of Kimihiro Watanuki, a high school student that is plagued by ayakashi spirits, where he stumbles upon a shop that grants wishes. He meets the owner, Yuko Ichihara, a mysterious witch of many names and esoteric known. For a price, she offers to grants his wish to rid of spirits, but for a price, to become Yuko's part-time cook and housekeeper.

Cast and characters

Anne Watanabe as Yuko Ichihara, a shop owner that grants people's wishes.
Shōta Sometani as Kimihiro Watanuki, a teenage boy that can see and plagued by ayakashi.
Masahiro Higashide as Shizuka Dōmeki, Kimihiro's classmate that lives in a shrine.
Karen Miyazaki as Himawari Kunogi, Kimihiro's love interest and classmate. 
Rika Kawashima and Tsumugi Hatekeyama as Maru and Moro, two artificial beings that keeps Yuko's shop in existence.
Yumi Adachi as Jōrogumo, a yōkai that is linked to spiders.

Production

In September 2012, it was announced that CLAMP's manga series, xxxHolic will be adapted into a live-action television miniseries. Anne Watanabe was announced as the role of Yuko Ichihara, while Shōta Sometani playing Kimihiro Watanuki. The series is directed and written by Keisuke Toyoshima with Jun Tsugita as a co-writer, and will air on Wowow on February 24, 2013. It was announced that the series will run for eight episodes. Suga Shikao, who provided many theme songs for the anime series, provided the opening theme song for the miniseries, titled "Aitai" (アイタイ).

Episode list

Reception
Kotaku felt Shōta Sometani's portrayal of Watanuki's character was appropriate, but believed Anne Watanabe who played Yuko overshadowed him.

References

External links
CLAMP Drama xxxHOLiC at Wowow
xxxHOLiC at IMDb

XxxHolic
Japanese television miniseries
Japanese television dramas based on manga